Shoshanna Keats Jaskoll (born 1975) is an American-Israeli activist and writer whose work focuses on women's rights in Orthodox Judaism and the visibility of women in Israel's Orthodox communities.

Keats Jaskoll was born and raised in Lakewood Township, New Jersey in a Jewish but non-Orthodox family. After migrating to Israel in 2007, Keats Jaskoll gained public attention through her co-founding and leadership of a women's advocacy group Chochmat Nashim and her writing at the Times of Israel news site. A key issue promoted by Keats Jaskoll is the combatting of the fundamentalist trend among some Orthodox Jewish publications to refuse the printing of any visual depiction of women.

References

External links 
 

1975 births
Living people
Orthodox Judaism in Israel
People from Lakewood Township, New Jersey
Jewish women writers
Israeli women's rights activists